The 1948 West Texas State Buffaloes football team was an American football team that represented West Texas State College (now known as West Texas A&M University) in the Border Conference during the 1948 college football season. In its second season under head coach Frank Kimbrough, the team compiled a 6–5 record (2–3 against conference opponents) and outscored opponents by a total of 192 to 153.

Schedule

References

West Texas State
West Texas A&M Buffaloes football seasons
West Texas State Buffaloes football